Triaxomasia orientanus is a moth of the family Tineidae first described by Margarita Gennadievna Ponomarenko and Kyu-Tek Park in 1996. It found in Korea and Russia.

The wingspan is about 10 mm. The forewings are greyish white, scattered with greyish-brown scales forming transverse lines and spots. The hindwings are brownish grey.

References

Moths described in 1996
Nemapogoninae